A deputy leader (in Scottish English, sometimes depute leader) in the Westminster system is the second-in-command of a political party, behind the party leader. Deputy leaders often become Deputy Prime Minister when their parties are elected to government. The deputy leader may take on the role of the leader if the current leader is, for some reason, unable to perform their role as leader. For example, the deputy leader often takes the place of the party leader at Question Time sessions in their absence. They also often have other responsibilities of party management.

Current Deputy Leaders

Australia
 Josh Frydenberg, Deputy Leader of the Liberal Party of Australia
 Richard Marles, Deputy Leader of the Australian Labor Party
 David Littleproud, Deputy Leader of the National Party of Australia
 Nick McKim and Larissa Waters, Deputy Leaders of the Australian Greens

Canada
 Vacant, Deputy Leader of the Liberal Party of Canada
 Ang Davidson, Deputy Leader of the Green Party of Canada
 Vacant, Deputy Leader of the Conservative Party of Canada
 Alexandre Boulerice, Deputy Leader of the New Democratic Party

Ireland
 Simon Coveney, Deputy Leader of Fine Gael
 Dara Calleary, Deputy Leader of Fianna Fáil
 Michelle O'Neill, Vice President of Sinn Féin
 Catherine Martin, Deputy Leader of the Green Party
 Anne McCloskey, Deputy Leader of Aontú

New Zealand
 Gerry Brownlee, Deputy Leader of the National Party of New Zealand
 Kelvin Davis, Deputy Leader of the New Zealand Labour Party
 Fletcher Tabuteau, Deputy Leader of New Zealand First
 Brooke van Velden, Deputy Leader of ACT New Zealand

United Kingdom
 Angela Rayner, Deputy Leader of the Labour Party
 Daisy Cooper, Deputy Leader of the Liberal Democrats
 Amelia Womack, Deputy Leader of the Green Party of England and Wales

Scotland
 Keith Brown, Deputy Leader of the Scottish National Party
 Jackie Baillie, Deputy Leader of the Scottish Labour Party
 Alistair Carmichael, Deputy Leader of the Scottish Liberal Democrats

Wales
 Carolyn Harris, Deputy Leader of the Welsh Labour Party
 Rhun ap Iorwerth & Siân Gwenllian, Deputy Leaders of Plaid Cymru
 Christine Humphreys & Kirsty Williams, Deputy Leaders of the Welsh Liberal Democrats
 Duncan Rees & Lauren James, Deputy Leaders of the Wales Green Party

Northern Ireland
 Nigel Dodds, Deputy Leader of the Democratic Unionist Party
 Nichola Mallon, Deputy Leader of the Social Democratic and Labour Party
 Stephen Farry, Deputy Leader of the Alliance Party of Northern Ireland
 Malachai O'Hara, Deputy Leader of the Green Party in Northern Ireland

See also
Deputy Prime Minister

Notes

References

Political occupations